The Republican Party of Cameroon is an official Cameroonian Political Party following the decision Number 00000087/D/MINATD/DAP/SDE/SPP on April 15, 2013. It has Baongla Georges Gilbert as President.

Political parties in Cameroon